Alja Vrček  (born 10 August 1993) is a Slovenian handball player for MRK Krka and the Slovenian national team.

She was selected to represent Slovenia at the 2017 World Women's Handball Championship.

References

1993 births
Living people
Slovenian female handball players
Place of birth missing (living people)
Competitors at the 2018 Mediterranean Games
Mediterranean Games bronze medalists for Slovenia
Mediterranean Games medalists in handball